Harding Gill Tract is an unincorporated community and census-designated place (CDP) in Hidalgo County, Texas, United States. It was first listed as a CDP prior to the 2020 census.

It is in the northeast part of the county, bordered to the north by Hargill.

References 

Populated places in Hidalgo County, Texas
Census-designated places in Hidalgo County, Texas
Census-designated places in Texas